Men of the North is a 1930 American Western film directed by Hal Roach and written by Richard Schayer from a story by Willard Mack. The film stars Gilbert Roland, Barbara Leonard, Arnold Korff, Robert Elliott and George Davis. The film was released on September 27, 1930, by Metro-Goldwyn-Mayer. It is notable as the only film Roach made as a director-for-hire, as he normally functioned as a producer.

Plot
Louis (Roland), a charming French-Canadian, is accused of stealing gold from a mine by Mountie Sergeant Mooney (Elliot) after getting a tip from Louis' girl friend, Woolie-Woolie (Quartero), who correctly suspects he has fallen in love with Nedra (Leonard), the mine owner's daughter. Louis has to work hard to prove his innocence, even to the point of saving other characters' lives in a series of incidents.

Cast 
Gilbert Roland as Louis La Bey 
Barbara Leonard as Nedra Ruskin
Arnold Korff as John Ruskin
Robert Elliott as Sergeant Mooney
George Davis as Corporal Smith
Nina Quartero as Woolie-Woolie 
Robert Graves as Priest

Production Notes

According to the AFI Catalog, it was simultaneously filmed in Spanish, French, German and Italian versions, all directed by Roach. The Mexican-born Roland also appeared in the Spanish version, while the multi-lingual Leonard appeared in the French, German and Italian versions.

Although Roach did not produce the picture, he did give bit parts (in the English version) to two of his contract players, Charlie Hall and Our Gang member Dorothy DeBorba.

References

External links 
 

1930 films
1930s English-language films
American Western (genre) films
1930 Western (genre) films
Metro-Goldwyn-Mayer films
Films directed by Hal Roach
American black-and-white films
1930s American films